Valery Leonidovich Reinhold (18 February 1942 – 11 February 2020) was a Soviet footballer who played as a striker in the 1960s and 1970s.

Career
Born in Moscow, Reinhold began playing youth football with Spartak Moscow. He joined Spartak's senior side and made his professional debut in the Soviet Top League during 1960. Reinhold would win the 1962 Soviet Top League and the 1963 and 1965 Soviet Cups with Spartak. Reinhold scored 32 goals in 176 league appearances for Spartak before finishing his career with spells at Trud Voronezh and Shinnik Yaroslavl.

Reinhold died in Moscow at age 77.

References

External links
Profile at Footballfacts.ru

1942 births
2020 deaths
Soviet footballers
Honoured Masters of Sport of the USSR
FC Spartak Moscow players
FC Fakel Voronezh players
FC Shinnik Yaroslavl players
Association football forwards